El Campillo, or Campillo, is a municipality in the province of Huelva, Spain. It was reported in the 2005 census with 2,318 inhabitants.

Demographics

References

External links
  Statistics Institute of Andalusia

Municipalities in the Province of Huelva